Mastax pygmaea is a species of beetle in the family Carabidae with restricted distribution in the Indonesia.

References

Mastax pygmaea
Beetles of Asia
Beetles described in 1930